The glutamate hypothesis of schizophrenia models the subset of pathologic mechanisms of schizophrenia linked to glutamatergic signaling. The hypothesis was initially based on a set of clinical, neuropathological, and, later, genetic findings pointing at a hypofunction of glutamatergic signaling via NMDA receptors. While thought to be more proximal to the root causes of schizophrenia, it does not negate the dopamine hypothesis, and the two may be ultimately brought together by circuit-based models. The development of the hypothesis allowed for the integration of the GABAergic and oscillatory abnormalities into the converging disease model and made it possible to discover the causes of some disruptions.

Like the dopamine hypothesis, the development of the glutamate hypothesis developed from the observed effects of mind-altering drugs. However, where dopamine agonists can mimic positive symptoms with significant risks to brain structures during and after use, NMDA antagonists mimic some positive and negative symptoms with less brain harm, when combined with a GABAA activating drug. Likely, both dopaminergic and glutaminergic abnormalities are implicated in schizophrenia, from a profound alteration in the function of the chemical synapses, as well as electrical synaptic irregularities. These form a portion of the complex constellation of factors, neurochemically, psychologically, psychosocially, and structurally, which result in schizophrenia.

The role of heteromer formation
Alteration in the expression, distribution, autoregulation, and prevalence of specific glutamate heterodimers alters relative levels of paired G proteins to the heterodimer-forming glutamate receptor in question.

Namely: 5HT2A and mGlu2 form a dimer which mediates psychotomimetic and entheogenic effects of psychedelics; as such this receptor is of interest in schizophrenia. Agonists at either constituent receptor may modulate the other receptor allosterically; e.g. glutamate-dependent signaling via mGlu2 may modulate 5HT2A-ergic activity. Equilibrium between mGlu2/5HT2A is altered against tendency towards of psychosis by neuroleptic-pattern 5HT2A antagonists and mGlu2 agonists; both display antipsychotic activity. AMPA, the most widely distributed receptor in the brain, is a tetrameric ionotropic receptor; alterations in equilibrium between constituent subunits are seen in mGlu2/5HT2A antagonist (antipsychotic) administration- GluR2 is seen to be upregulated in the PFC while GluR1 downregulates in response to antipsychotic administration.

Reelin abnormalities may also be involved in the pathogenesis of schizophrenia via a glutamate-dependent mechanism. Reelin expression deficits are seen in schizophrenia, and reelin enhances expression of AMPA and NMDA alike. As such deficits in these two ionotropic glutamate receptors may be partially explained by altered reelin cascades. Neuregulin 1 deficits may also be involved in glutaminergic hypofunction as NRG1 hypofunction leads to schizophrenia-pattern behavior in mice; likely due in part to reduced NMDA signaling via Src suppression.

The role of synaptic pruning

Various neurotrophic factors dysregulate in schizophrenia and other mental illnesses, namely BDNF; expression of which is lowered in schizophrenia as well as in major depression and bipolar disorder. BDNF regulates in an AMPA-dependent mechanism - AMPA and BDNF alike are critical mediators of growth cone survival. NGF, another neurotrophin involved in maintenance of synaptic plasticity is similarly seen in deficit.

Dopaminergic excess, classically understood to result in schizophrenia, puts oxidative load on neurons; leading to inflammatory response and microglia activation. Similarly, toxoplasmosis infection in the CNS (positively correlated to schizophrenia) activates inflammatory cascades, also leading to microglion activation. The lipoxygenase-5 inhibitor minocycline has been seen to be marginally effective in halting schizophrenia progression. One of such inflammatory cascades' downstream transcriptional target, NF-κB, is observed to have altered expression in schizophrenia.

In addition, CB2 is one of the most widely distributed glial cell-expressed receptors, downregulation of this inhibitory receptor may increase global synaptic pruning activity. While difference in expression or distribution is observed, when the CB2 receptor is knocked out in mice, schizophreniform behaviors manifest. This may deregulate synaptic pruning processes in a tachyphlaxis mechanism wherein immediate excess CB2 activity leads to phosphorylation of the receptor via GIRK, resultant in b-arrestin-dependent internalization and subsequent trafficking to the proteasome for degradation.

The role of endogenous antagonists

Alterations in production of endogenous NMDA antagonists such as agmatine and kynurenic acid have been shown in schizophrenia. Deficit in NMDA activity produces psychotomimetic effects, though it remains to be seen if the blockade of NMDA via these agents is causative or actually mimetic of patterns resultant from monoaminergic disruption.

AMPA, the most widely distributed receptor in the brain, mediates long term potentiation via activity-dependent modulation of AMPA density. GluR1 subunit-containing AMPA receptors are Ca2+ permeable while GluR2/3 subunit-positive receptors are nearly impermeable to calcium ions. In the regulated pathway, GluR1 dimers populate the synapse at a rate proportional to NMDA-ergic Ca2+ influx. In the constitutative pathway, GluR2/3 dimers populate the synapse at a steady state.

This forms a positive feedback loop, where a small trigger impulse degating NMDA from Mg2+ pore blockade results in calcium influx, this calcium influx then triggers trafficking of GluR1-containing(Ca2+ permeable) subunits to the PSD, such trafficking of GluR1-positive AMPA to the postsynaptic neuron allows for upmodulation of the postsynaptic neuron's calcium influx in response to presynaptic calcium influx. Robust negative feedback at NMDA from kynurenic acid, magnesium, zinc, and agmatine prevents runaway feedback.

Misregulation of this pathway would sympathetically dysregulate LTP via disruption of NMDA. Such alteration in LTP may play a role, specifically in negative symptoms of schizophrenia, in creation of more broad disruptions such as loss of brain volume; an effect of the disease which antidopaminergics actually worsen, rather than treat.

The role of a7 nicotinic

Anandamide, an endocannabinoid, is an a7 nicotinic antagonist. Cigarettes, consumed far out of proportion by schizophrenics, contain nornitrosonicotine; a potent a7 antagonist. This may indicate a7 pentameter excess as a causative factor, or possibly as a method of self-medication to combat antipsychotic side effects. Cannabidiol, a FAAH inhibitor, increases levels in anandamide and may have antipsychotic effect; though results are mixed here as anandamide also is a cannabinoid and as such displays some psychotomimetic effect. However, a7 nicotinic agonists have been indicated as potential treatments for schizophrenia, though evidence is somewhat contradictory there is indication a7 nAChR is somehow involved in the pathogenesis of schizophrenia.

The role of 5-HT
This deficit in activation also results in a decrease in activity of 5-HT1A receptors in the raphe nucleus. This serves to increase global serotonin levels, as 5-HT1A serves as an autoreceptor.  The 5-HT1B receptor, also acting as an autoreceptor, specifically within the striatum, but also parts of basal ganglia then will inhibit serotonin release. This disinhibits frontal dopamine release. The local deficit of 5-HT within the striatum, basal ganglia, and prefrontal cortex causes a deficit of excitatory 5-HT6 signalling. This could possibly be the reason antipsychotics sometimes are reported to aggravate negative symptoms as antipsychotics are 5HT6 antagonists This receptor is primarily GABAergic, as such, it causes an excess of glutamatergic, noradrenergic, dopaminergic, and cholinergic activity within the prefrontal cortex and the striatum. An excess of 5-HT7 signaling within the thalamus also creates too much excitatory transmission to the prefrontal cortex. Combined with another critical abnormality observed in those with schizophrenia: 5-HT2A dysfunction, this altered signalling cascade creates cortical, thus cognitive abnormalities. 5-HT2A allows a link between cortical, thus conscious, and the basal ganglia, unconscious. Axons from 5-HT2A neurons in layer V of the cerebral cortex reach the basal ganglia, forming a feedback loop. Signalling from layer V of the cerebral cortex to the basal ganglia alters 5-HT2C signalling. This feedback loop with 5-HT2A/5-HT2C is how the outer cortex layers can exert some control over our neuropeptides, specifically opioid peptides, oxytocin and vasopressin. This alteration in this limbic-layer V axis may create the profound change in social cognition (and sometimes cognition as a whole) that is observed in schizophrenia. However, genesis of the actual alterations is a much more complex phenomena.

The role of inhibitory transmission
The cortico-basal ganglia-thalamo-cortical loop is the source of the ordered input necessary for a higher level upper cortical loop. Feedback is controlled by the inhibitory potential of the cortices via the striatum. Through 5-HT2A efferents from layer V of the cortex transmission proceeds through the striatum into the globulus pallidus internal and substantia nigra pars compacta. This core input to the basal ganglia is combined with input from the subthalamic nucleus. The only primarily dopaminergic pathway in this loop is a reciprocal connection from the substantia nigra pars reticulata to the striatum.

Dopaminergic drugs such as dopamine releasing agents and direct dopamine receptor agonists create alterations in this primarily GABAergic pathway via increased dopaminergic feedback from the substantia nigra pars compacta to the striatum. However, dopamine also modulates other cortical areas, namely the VTA; with efferents to the amygdala and locus coeruleus, likely modulating anxiety and paranoid aspects of psychotic experience. As such, the glutamate hypothesis is probably not an explanation of primary causative factors in positive psychosis, but rather might possibly be an explanation for negative symptoms.

Dopamine hypothesis of schizophrenia elaborates upon the nature of abnormal lateral structures found in someone with a high risk for psychosis.

Altered signalling cascades
Again, thalamic input from layer V is a crucial factor in the functionality of the human brain. It allows the two sides to receive similar inputs, thus be able to perceive the same world. In psychosis, thalamic input loses much of its integrated character: hyperactive core feedback loops overwhelm the ordered output.  This is due to excessive D2 and 5-HT2A activity. This alteration in input to the top and bottom of the cortex. The altered 5-HT signal cascade enhances the strength of excitatory thalamic input from layer V. This abnormality, enhancing the thalamic-cortical transmission cascade versus the corticostriatal control, creates a feedback loop, resulting in abnormally strong basal ganglia output.

The root of psychosis (experiences that cannot be explained, even within their own mind) is when basal ganglia input to layer V overwhelms the inhibitory potential of the higher cortexies resulting from striatal transmission. When combined with the excess prefrontal, specifically orbitofrontal transmission, from the hippocampus, this creates a brain prone to falling into self reinforcing belief.

However, given a specific environment, a person with this kind of brain (a human) can create a self-reinforcing pattern of maladaptive behavior, from the altered the layer II/III and III/I axises, from the disinhibited thalamic output. Rationality is impaired, primarily as response to the deficit of oxytocin and excess of vasopressin from the abnormal 5HT2C activity.

Frontal cortex activity will be impaired, when combined with excess DA activity: the basis for the advancement of schizophrenia, but it is also the neurologic mechanism behind many other psychotic diseases as well.. Heredation of schizophrenia may even be a result of conspecific "refrigerator parenting" techniques passed on though generations. However, the genetic component is the primary source of the neurological abnormalities which leave one prone to psychological disorders. Specifically, there is much overlap between bipolar disorder and schizophrenia, and other psychotic disorders.

Psychotic disorder is linked to excessive drug use, specifically dissociatives, psychedelics, stimulants, and marijuana.

Treatment
Alterations in serine racemase indicate that the endogenous NMDA agonist D-serine may be produced abnormally in schizophrenia and that d-serine may be an effective treatment for schizophrenia.

Schizophrenia is now treated by medications known as antipsychotics (or neuroleptics) that typically reduce dopaminergic activity because too much activity has been most strongly linked to positive symptoms, specifically persecutory delusions. Dopaminergic drugs do not induce the characteristic auditory hallucinations of schizophrenia. Dopaminergic drug abuse such as abuse of methamphetamine may result in a short lasting psychosis or provocation of a longer psychotic episode that may include symptoms of auditory hallucinations. The typical antipsychotics are known to have significant risks of side effects that can increase over time, and only show clinical effectiveness in reducing positive symptoms. Additionally, although newer atypical antipsychotics can have less affinity for dopamine receptors and still reduce positive symptoms, do not significantly reduce negative symptoms. A 2006 systematic review investigated the efficacy of glutamatergic drugs as add-on:

Psychotomimetic glutamate antagonists
Ketamine and PCP were observed to produce significant similarities to schizophrenia. Ketamine produces more similar symptoms (hallucinations, withdrawal) without observed permanent effects (other than ketamine tolerance). Both arylcyclohexamines have some(uM) affinity to D2 and as triple reuptake inhibitors. PCP is representative symptomatically, but does appear to cause brain structure changes seen in schizophrenia. Although unconfirmed, Dizocilpine discovered by a team at Merck seems to model both the positive and negative effects in a manner very similar to schizophreniform disorders.

Possible glutamate based treatment
An early clinical trial by Eli Lilly of the drug LY2140023 has shown potential for treating schizophrenia without the weight gain and other side-effects associated with conventional anti-psychotics. A trial in 2009 failed to prove superiority over placebo or Olanzapine, but Lilly explained this as being due to an exceptionally high placebo response. However, Eli Lilly terminated further development of the compound in 2012 after it failed in phase III clinical trials. This drug acts as a selective agonist at metabotropic mGluR2 and mGluR3 glutamate receptors (the mGluR3 gene has previously been associated with schizophrenia).

Studies of glycine (and related co-agonists at the NMDA receptor) added to conventional anti-psychotics have also found some evidence that these may improve symptoms in schizophrenia.

Animal models
Research done on mice in early 2009 has shown that when the neuregulin-1\ErbB post-synaptic receptor genes are deleted, the dendritic spines of glutamate neurons initially grow, but break down during later development. This led to symptoms (such as disturbed social function, inability to adapt to predictable future stressors) that overlap with schizophrenia. This parallels the time delay for symptoms setting in with schizophrenic humans who usually appear to show normal development until early adulthood.

Disrupted in schizophrenia 1 is a gene that is disrupted in schizophrenia.

Notes and references

Further reading

External links
 Glutamate Hypothesis of Schizophrenia By Bita Moghaddam

Neuroscience of schizophrenia